Rocky De Witt is an American politician.

Early career and personal life
De Witt and his wife Vicki are residents of Lawton. He was previously married to Julie Katseres, with whom he raised three sons. De Witt worked for the MidAmerican Energy Company for 22 years. After leaving MidAmerican Energy, De Witt provided security for the Woodbury County Sheriff's Office.

Political career
De Witt was first elected to the District 5 seat on the Woodbury County Board of Supervisors in November 2016, and reelected in 2020. He served as board chairman in 2018 and 2021. In December 2021, De Witt began his campaign for the District 1 seat of the Iowa Senate. De Witt defeated incumbent Democratic legislator Jackie Smith, who was redistricted to District 1.

References

Living people
County supervisors in Iowa
21st-century American politicians
Republican Party Iowa state senators
Year of birth missing (living people)
People from Woodbury County, Iowa